Archeanassa or Archaeanassa (Greek), a native of Colophon, was a hetaera or courtesan living in Athens in the late 5th century BC. According to biographical sources about Plato, the philosopher as a young man was deeply in love with Archeanassa and addressed a four-line epigram to her. The poem is quoted in full by Diogenes Laërtius in his biography of Plato and by Athenaeus in a survey of famous courtesans. The same poem is also found, in almost identical form, in the Byzantine compilation called Anthologia Palatina. In that source, although it is still addressed to Archeanassa, its authorship is attributed not to Plato but to Asclepiades. Modern scholars tend to accept the attribution to Plato as valid.

Notes 

Hetairai
Greek female prostitutes
Ancient Colophonians
Metics in Classical Athens
5th-century BC Athenians
5th-century BC Greek women